Route 21 is a  south–north state highway in Massachusetts that runs between U.S. Route 20 (US 20) and Route 141 in Springfield and Route 9 in Belchertown. Along the way it intersects several major highways including Interstate 90 (I-90) in Ludlow and US 202 and Route 181 in Belchertown.

Route description

The route begins at U.S. Route 20 in the Indian Orchard section of Springfield.  It heads north, intersecting with Route 141 before crossing the Chicopee River into Ludlow.  Once in Ludlow, the road continues in a northeasterly direction.  It passes under the Massachusetts Turnpike, with access to that road via Exit 7.  It continues through town, passing south of the Springfield Reservoir before heading northward into Belchertown.  In Belchertown it shares a concurrency with U.S. Route 202, which ends at Route 181.  From there Route 21 makes its final short trek to its current terminus at Route 9.

History 
Prior to the completion of the Quabbin Reservoir, Route 21 extended further northward.  It passed through the former town of Enfield, then northward along the Swift River into Greenwich and the northern end of Dana before heading through the current town of Petersham and into Athol, where it terminated at what is now Route 2A.  The southern portion of the road (Old Enfield Road) is still accessible in Belchertown. The northern trunk follows Pleasant Street and New Sherborn Road in Athol, then the Monson Turnpike (Turnpike Road) in Petersham, where the road had an intersection with Route 122.  Much of the route south of this intersection lies within the Quabbin Reservoir State Reservation.

Into the 1970s. MA-21 Started in Forest Park with an Intersection with U.S. Route 5 near the South End Bridge, today Interstate 91 now overtakes that intersection along with MA-83. From there, the route went down Longhill Street until Sumner Avenue. Through the 6 way Intersection with Belmont Avenue and Dickinson Street, known to locals as the X. From there, the route went down Sumner until the intersection with Allen Street which then made a turn onto Cooley Street at the Sixteen Acres section of town. From there, Cooley Street continued north into Parker Street which took drivers to today's terminus, outside of Indian Orchard. There were plans to bypass this with the Springfield Bypass but it was never completed. Only a small part where Summner and Allen Streets were made for the highway and a short highway bypass of Allen and Cooley Streets known as Bicentennial Highway was constructed to relieve passengers. It is unknown why it was shortened, speculation includes to ease the traffic through that section and to keep motorists away since that area of town was some of the most dangerous in the 1970s. Today, MA-83 overtook the route from the X down to Route 5 and Interstate 91.

Major intersections

References

021